The Masmughans of Damavand (Middle Persian: Masmughan-i Dumbawand, New Persian: مس مغان دماوند, meaning Great Magians of Damavand) were a local dynasty, which ruled Damavand and its surrounding areas from ca. 651 to 760. The founder of the dynasty was a Karenid named Mardanshah of Damavand.

History 
The Masmughans of Damavand are first mentioned by Al-Tabari, where the Masmughan Mardanshah of Damavand reportedly aided the Mihranid Siyavakhsh at Ray against the Arabs. The forces of Siyavakhsh and Mardanshah, were, however, defeated. Mardanshah then made peace with the Arabs in return for an annual tribute.

In 748/749, Abu Muslim sought to subdue the Masmughan but his general Musa ibn Kab was ambushed by the local forces who enjoyed the advantage of the terrain, which forced him to return to Ray. In 758/759 due to disputes between Abarwiz and his brother, who is simply called Masmughan in Arabic sources, Abarwiz then went over to the Caliph Al-Mansur who gave him a pension. In some Arabic sources Abarwiz is called Al-Masmughan Malik (malik of the Masmughans), and is known for his bravery.

In 760, Masmughan, the brother of Abarwiz, was at war against his father-in-law, the Dabuyid ispahbadh Khurshid, but when he heard about the Abbasid expedition to Tabaristan, he made peace with the latter. The Arabs then defeated the ispahbadh and the Masmughan, who was captured along with his daughters Bakhtariya and Shakla. One of these daughters became the wife of Al-Mahdi.

See also 
 Dabuyid dynasty
 Seven Parthian clans

References

Sources 

Zoroastrian rulers
House of Karen
Damavand County
History of Mazandaran Province
Monarchy in Persia and Iran
7th century in Iran
8th century in Iran
651 establishments